Richard Borshay Lee  (born 1937) is a Canadian anthropologist. Lee has studied at the University of Toronto and University of California, Berkeley, where he received a Ph.D. He holds a position at the University of Toronto as Professor Emeritus of Anthropology.  Lee researches issues concerning the indigenous people of Botswana and Namibia, particularly their ecology and history.

Known best for his work on the Ju'/hoansi, Lee won the 1980 Anisfield-Wolf Book Award for his book The !Kung San: Men, Women, and Work in a Foraging Society. With Irven DeVore, Lee was co-organiser of the 1966 University of Chicago Symposium on "Man the Hunter". Lee co-edited with Richard Daly The Cambridge Encyclopedia of Hunter-Gatherers, which was first published in 1999. In 2003, Anthropologica, the journal of the Canadian Anthropology Society, dedicated an issue to Lee's oeuvre. In 2011 he co-authored the children's book Africans Thought of It: Amazing Innovations with Bathseba Opini.

Most recently his research has focused on the anthropology of health and the cultural and social
factors in AIDS epidemic in southern Africa for which he has received funds from the National Institutes of Health (U.S.) via Columbia University School of Public Health as well as directly from the University of Toronto.

Professional associations 
Lee has been active in several professional associations including: the Association of American Anthropologists for which he organized several meetings and symposiums; founding member of Anthropologists for Radical Political Change; past president of the Canadian Anthropologist Society and the Canadian Ethnology Society. He has also been a referee for various publications (American Anthropologist, Current Anthropology) and granting agencies (Social Sciences and Humanities Research Council, Wenner-Gren Foundation and the National Science Foundation). He is a member of the Royal Society of Canada and is a Foreign Honorary Member of the American Academy of Arts and Sciences.

Selected publications
Subsistence Ecology of !Kung Bushmen (1965), PhD Dissertation, University of California, Berkeley.
Hunter-gatherers in process: The Kalahari Research Project, 1963-76 (1978), in G. Foster et al. (Eds.), Long-term field research in social anthropology (pp. 303–321). New York: Academic Publishing.
The !Kung San: Men, Women and Work in a Foraging Society (1979), Cambridge and New York: Cambridge University Press. Chapter 9 available here 
Anthropology at the crossroads: From the age of ethnography to the age of world systems (1998), Social Dynamics 24(1), 34-65.
The Cambridge Encyclopedia of Hunter-Gatherers(1999), Cambridge: Cambridge University Press.
Indigenous rights and the politics of identity in post-apartheid southern Africa (2003), in B. Dean & J. M. Levi (Eds.), At the risk of being heard: Identity, indigenous rights, and postcolonial states (pp. 80–111). Ann Arbor, MI: University of Michigan Press.
The Dobe Ju/'hoansi (2003), 3rd ed., Thomson Learning/Wadsworth.
Power and property in twenty-first century foragers: A critical examination (2004), in T. Widlok & T. Wolde, (Eds.), Power and equality: Encapsulation, commercialization, discrimination (pp. 16–31). Oxford: Berg Publishing.
Africans Thought of It: Amazing Innovations (2011)
Collection of publications and pictures by Dr. Lee, Richard B.

Awards
1980 Anisfield-Wolf Book Award for The !Kung San: Men, Women, and Work in a Foraging Society
1980 Herskovits Award of the African Studies Association for The !Kung San: Men, Women, and Work in a Foraging Society
 2016 Appointed as an Officer of the Order of Canada.

See also
Economic anthropology
Original affluent society
Leveling mechanism
Marshall Sahlins

References

External links
Anthropologica Vol. 45 No. 1, 2003
Expanded Bibliography by Jacqueline Solway
Biography of Richard Lee
Richard Lee archival papers held at the University of Toronto Archives and Records Management Services

1937 births
Living people
Canadian anthropologists
Fellows of the Royal Society of Canada
Foreign associates of the National Academy of Sciences
University of Toronto alumni
Academic staff of the University of Toronto
Officers of the Order of Canada
University of California, Berkeley College of Letters and Science faculty